Emiliano Massa and Leonardo Mayer won the title, defeating Sergei Bubka and Jérémy Chardy in the final, 2–6, 6–3, 6–4.

Seeds

  Dušan Lojda /  Donald Young (first round)
  Andreas Haider-Maurer /  Petar Jelenić (quarterfinals)
  Kim Sun-yong /  Aljoscha Thron (semifinals)
  Andrea Arnaboldi /  Niels Desein (first round)
  Raony Carvalho /  Ryan Sweeting (quarterfinals)
  Timothy Neilly /  Tim Smyczek (second round)
  Carsten Ball /  Sam Querrey (second round)
  Sergei Bubka /  Jérémy Chardy (final)

Draw

Finals

Top half

Bottom half

Sources
Draw

Boys' Doubles
2005